South of Santa Fe is a 1932 American western film directed by Bert Glennon and starring Bob Steele, Ed Brady and Eddie Dunn. It was made by the producer Trem Carr and distributed by the independent Sono Art-World Wide Pictures.

Synopsis
A man is killed for his map of the site of a gold mine, but only half the map is found. Meanwhile Tom Keene arrives, and helps the daughter of the murdered man.

Cast
 Bob Steele as Tom Keene
 Janis Elliott as 	Beth Thornton
 Ed Brady as	Jack Stone
 Eddie Dunn as 	Lankey
 Al Bridge as 	Henchman Bully
 Gordon De Main as Granger 
 Chris-Pin Martin as 	Pedro 
 John Elliott as 	Thornton
 Al Ernest Garcia a 	Captain Felipe Mendezez Gonzales Rodrigues 
 Hank Bell as 	Henchman
 Bob Burns as 	Cowhand 
 Jack Evans as 	Granger Cowhand 
 Al Haskell as 	Messenger 
 Perry Murdock as 	Henchman 
 Archie Ricks as 	Henchman 
 F.R. Smith as Granger Rider 
 Slim Whitaker as John Roberts

References

Bibliography
 Fetrow, Alan G. . Sound films, 1927-1939: a United States Filmography. McFarland, 1992.
 Pitts, Michael R. Western Movies: A TV and Video Guide to 4200 Genre Films. McFarland, 1986.

External links
 

1932 films
1932 Western (genre) films
American Western (genre) films
Films directed by Bert Glennon
American black-and-white films
1930s English-language films
1930s American films